Alan Richardson,  (1905–1975) was a British Anglican priest and academic. From 1964 to 1975, he served as Dean of York.

Early life and education
Richardson was educated at Liverpool University, Exeter College, Oxford and Ridley Hall, Cambridge.

Ordained ministry
Ordained in 1928 his first post was as a curate at St Saviour's Liverpool. He was Vicar of Cambo and then Secretary of the Student Christian Movement. Later he was a canon of Durham Cathedral then Professor of Christian Theology at the University of Nottingham from 1953 until 1964 when he accepted the position as Dean of York, a post he held until his death.

Selected works
Richardson published extensively. Among his books were:
Creeds in the Making (1935), reprint 1980
The Redemption of Modernism (1935)
History and the Kingdom of God (1939)
The Miracle Stories of the Gospels (1941)
Christian Apologetics (1947)
A Theological Word Book of the Bible (editor) (1950)
The Gospel And Modern Thought (1950)
The Teacher's Commentary, revised edition, (co-editor) (1955), published in North America by Harper & Bros. as The Twentieth Century Bible Commentary
An Introduction to the Theology of the New Testament (1958) revised 1972 
History, sacred and profane, 1962 Bampton Lectures (1964)
A Dictionary of Christian Theology (1969), revised by John Bowden (1983) 
The Political Christ (1973)

Styles
 Mr Alan Richardson (1905–1928)
 The Revd Alan Richardson (1928–1943)
 The Revd Canon Alan Richardson (1943–1953)
 The Revd Professor Alan Richardson (1953–1964)
 The Very Revd Alan Richardson (1964–1975)

References

1905 births
1975 deaths
Deans of York
Alumni of the University of Liverpool
Alumni of Exeter College, Oxford
Academics of the University of Nottingham
Knights Commander of the Order of the British Empire